Satnam Rana is a presenter for the BBC, currently presenting on BBC news programme Midlands Today and features on BBC WM. She worked at Five Live for two years then came to BBC Birmingham where she has been working since 2002.

Early life and education
Rana was born and brought up in Wolverhampton, West Midlands, England and attended Smestow School. Since Rana was ten years old she wanted to be a journalist, graduating from Lancaster University in 1999.

Career
After graduating, Rana joined BBC Radio Five Live. Then, in 2002 she joined Midlands Today as a junior reporter.

BBC Midlands Today
Rana is a relief presenter for Midlands Today. She is also a regular presenter on breakfast, late and lunch bulletins. She mainly presents bank holiday and half term editions of Midlands Today and reports on culture and diversity issues in the region. Rana is also a presenter on BBC WM and has also worked for Inside Out.

References

External links 
 Midlands Today

British television presenters
Year of birth missing (living people)
Living people
Alumni of Lancaster University
Alumni of Grizedale College, Lancaster